Sharon A. Ray is an American politician serving as a member of the Ohio House of Representatives from the 66th district. She won the seat after incumbent Republican Steve Hambley decided to run for the Medina County Board of Commissioners. She defeated Democrat Donna Beheydt in 2020, winning 64.8% to 35.2%.

References

Living people
Republican Party members of the Ohio House of Representatives
Women state legislators in Ohio
21st-century American politicians
Year of birth missing (living people)
People from Wadsworth, Ohio
21st-century American women politicians